The 1908–09 Scottish Cup was the 36th season of Scotland's most prestigious football knockout competition. The Cup was not awarded in this season due to serious riots in the replay of the final between Rangers and Celtic.

Calendar

First round

Replays

Second replay

Match played at Ibrox Park

Third replay

Match played at Ibrox

Fourth replay

Match played at Love Street

Second round

Replay

Quarter-finals

Semi-finals

Replay

Final

Replay

See also
1908–09 in Scottish football

References

External links

1908-09
1908 in association football
1909 in association football
1908–09 domestic association football cups
Cup